Kontrobersyal is a Philippine news journal hosted by Boy Abunda on ABS-CBN. It aired from May 10, 2003 to 2006.

External links
Boy Abunda, the King of Talk - Official Website

ABS-CBN News and Current Affairs shows
ABS-CBN original programming
Philippine television talk shows
2003 Philippine television series debuts
2006 Philippine television series endings
Filipino-language television shows